Lechenaultia  magnifica, commonly known as magnificent leschenaultia, is a species of flowering plant in the family Goodeniaceae and is endemic to the south-west of Western Australia. It is an erect, perennial herb or subshrub with crowded, linear to narrowly lance-shaped leaves, and pink to mauve or purple flowers.

Description

Taxonomy
Lechenaultia magnifica was first formally described in 2006 by Leigh William Sage in the journal Nuytsia from material collected by Fred Hort near Bindoon in 2002. The specific epithet (magnifica) means "splendid" or "magnificent", referring to the floral display of this species.

Distribution and habitat
Magnificent lechenaultia is only known from the Bindoon area in south-western Western Australia where it grows in open woodland.

Conservation status
This lechenaultia is listed as "Priority One" by the Government of Western Australia Department of Biodiversity, Conservation and Attractions, meaning that it is known from only one or a few locations that are potentially at risk.

References

Asterales of Australia
magnifica
Eudicots of Western Australia
Plants described in 2006